Hans Seidelin may refer to:

  (1632–1668), Danish priest
 Hans Seidelin (1665–1740), Danish civil servant and landowner
 , Danish Supreme Court justice
 Hans Didrik Brinck-Seidelin, landowner who was ennobled in 1752
  (1750–1831), landowner